Cyperus lentiginosus is a species of sedge that is native to southern parts of North America, Central America and northern parts of South America.

See also 
 List of Cyperus species

References 

lentiginosus
Plants described in 1903
Flora of Belize
Flora of Colombia
Flora of Cuba
Flora of Guatemala
Flora of Honduras
Flora of Mexico
Flora of Texas
Taxa named by Charles Frederick Millspaugh
Taxa named by Mary Agnes Chase
Flora without expected TNC conservation status